is a 1996 Japanese comedy romance film written and directed by Juzo Itami.

The film stars Juzo's wife and regular leading-lady Nobuko Miyamoto as a woman who is hired by a failing supermarket to help it compete against an aggressive local rival.  Another frequent star of Juzo's films, Masahiko Tsugawa, plays her boss and later romantic interest.

Supermarket Woman was a box-office success in Japan and was nominated for six Japanese Academy Awards in 1997, including Best Film, Director and Actress, but did not win in any categories.

Plot
A new supermarket 'Bargains Galore' opens, and threatens the longer-established 'Honest Goro' with its aggressive price cutting.  The owner of 'Honest Goro' (Goro, played by Masahiko Tsugawa) inspects the new store, and bumps into an old classmate he hasn't seen for years (Hanako, played by Nobuko Miyamoto).  She uses her 'housewife's know-how' to show him why his supermarket is performing so badly.  He resolves to make his supermarket the best in Japan, and gives her a job as head cashier.

She helps to improve customer service and introduces new sales techniques and a policy of selling only fresh food.  However, in doing so she angers senior staff members who don't want to change their ways.  However, the store gradually attracts more customers.

Meanwhile, the manager of 'Honest Goro' is taking bribes from 'Bargains Galore', and eventually resigns to start work at the new supermarket, trying to take the rest of the staff with him.  After an impassioned speech by Hanako, the majority decide to remain loyal to Goro, and redouble their efforts to provide customer satisfaction.

In a last-ditch attempt to sabotage Goro, the old manager and the head butcher attempt to steal all the store's meat.  Hanako discovers them, and is locked in the back of their freezer van when they drive off.  Goro pursues them in a dekotora, and after a high-speed chase Hanako is saved.

'Honest Goro' opens on New Year's Day to a store full of customers, while 'Bargain's Galore' is practically empty.

Cast
 Nobuko Miyamoto as Hanako Inoue

 Masahiko Tsugawa as Gorô Kobayashi

 Ryunosuke Kaneda as Gorô no Ani - Ichirô

 Chikako Isomura as Ichirô no Ichizoku

Release
Supermarket Woman had its world premiere at the Seattle Film Festival on 5 June 1996. Supermarket Woman was released in Japan on June 15, 1996 where it was distributed by Toho.

References

Footnotes

Sources

External links
 

1996 films
Japanese romantic comedy films
Films directed by Jūzō Itami
1996 romantic comedy films
1990s business films
1990s Japanese films